The mugham khanandas and musicians are listed by the first letter in their last name (not including the words "a", "an", or "the"). If you see notice a significant artist that is missing from this page, please start a page for them before adding them to this list.

A
Aghakhan Abdullayev
Habil Aliyev, kamancha performer
Malakkhanim Ayyubova

B
Arif Babayev

G
Sara Gadimova
Jabbar Garyagdyoglu
Alim Gasimov

H
Hajibaba Huseynov

I
Mansum Ibrahimov

J
Janali Akbarov

M
Yagub Mammadov
Rubaba Muradova

R
Gadir Rustamov

S
Khan Shushinski
Seyid Shushinski

Z
Abdulbagi Zulalov (Bulbuljan)

Mugham
Mugham